Tahat may refer to:
 Mount Tahat, a mountain in Algeria
 Tahart, a village in Algeria

See also 
 Taht (disambiguation)